Waki or WAKI may refer to:

Places 
 Waki, Yamaguchi, a town in Japan
 Waki, Poland, a village in Poland
 Waki, Mali, a town in Mali
 Waki, Jaoli, a village in Maharashtra, India
 Waki, Vikramgad, a village in Maharashtra, India
 Waki, Beed, a village in Maharashtra, India

Other uses 
 WAKI, a radio station in Tennessee, US
 Waki-gamae, one of the five stances in kendo
 Waki (river), a river in French Guiana
 Waki, one of the roles in a Noh play

People with the surname
 Kenji Waki (born 1960), Japanese shogi player
 Masashi Waki (born 1945), Japanese politician
 Philip Waki, Kenyan judge

Japanese-language surnames